The Jinjira massacre was a planned killing of civilians by the Pakistan army during the Bangladesh liberation war of 1971. 

The killing took place at the unions Jinjira, Kalindi and Shubhadya of Keraniganj Upazila across the Buriganga River from Dhaka. This massacre has been detailed in the book Dead Reckoning: Memories of the 1971 Bangladesh War by Sarmila Bose, on pages 76 and 77. According to Pak Army Sources and Civilian Eyewitness accounts interviewees, this place was used as ammunition dump by Rebelling Bengali Soldiers and Bengali Policemen who have deserted with their weapons. When Pak Army went there it came under fire from rebels and during the cross fire a number of civilians were caught in between. The number of casualties is about 3000 civilians.

Background
The 1971 Bangladesh atrocities began as the Pakistan army launched Operation Searchlight on 25 March 1971 to suppress the Bengali uprising in then East Pakistan. As a reaction, people from Dhaka flocked to Keraniganj on the other side of the river. The union Jinjira and nearby areas were inhabited by a large number of Hindu families. The elements of Pakistan army, now in control of Dhaka city after the crackdown of 25 March marked Jinjira and surrounding area as a target for military operation.

Massacre
The army started to amass forces around Keraniganj from midnight of 1 April. They took control of the Mitford Hospital by the river. At around 5 am, they commenced the attack by throwing flares from the roof of the mosque adjacent to the hospital. The army moved into Jinjira and opened fire on people. The massacre continued for nearly nine hours. One of the largest such executions took place beside a pond near Nandail Dak Street, where 60 people were lined up and shot. The soldiers also fired on the houses using gunpowder. More than a thousand people died in this massacre.

Cover-up in the Pakistani media
In the night of 2 April Pakistan Television broadcast news about strong military action against separatist miscreants taking shelter at Jinjira of Keraniganj on the other side of Buriganga. On 3 April The Morning News came up with the headline, "Actions taken against miscreants at Jinjira".

See also
 List of massacres in Bangladesh

References

Military history of Pakistan
Bangladesh Liberation War
1971 Bangladesh genocide
Massacres committed by Pakistan in East Pakistan